Prochoma is a village and a community of the Chalkidona municipality. Before the 2011 local government reform it was part of the municipality of Koufalia, of which it was a municipal district. The 2011 census recorded 1,214 inhabitants in the village and 2,440 inhabitants in the community. The community of Prochoma covers an area of 38.537 km2.

Administrative division
The community of Prochoma consists of three communities: 
Akropotamos (population 596)
Kastanas (population 630)
Prochoma (population 1,214)
The aforementioned population figures are as of 2011.

History

The population of Prochoma consists of Greek refugees from Pontus. The village was named Dogantzi until 1926.

See also
 List of settlements in the Thessaloniki regional unit

References

Populated places in Thessaloniki (regional unit)